The 2006 Asia Futsal Cup was the trial edition AFC Futsal Club Championship. It was held in Saveh, Iran between March 7 and March 12, 2006.

Qualified teams 
The following six teams will play the final tournament.

 Ardus Tashkent
 CAT Telecom
 Energobank
 Malaysia national futsal team
 Sharks
 Shensa Saveh

Venue

Group stage

Group A

Group B

Knockout stage

Semi-finals

Third place play-off

Final

Awards 

 Most Valuable Player
 Top Scorer
  Mahmoud Lotfi (8 goals)
 Fair-Play Award

References

External links

AFC Futsal Club Championship seasons
AFC
Club
International futsal competitions hosted by Iran
2006 in Japanese football
2006 in Malaysian football
2006 in Uzbekistani football
2006 in Thai football
2006 in Kyrgyzstani football